Mettmann II is an electoral constituency (German: Wahlkreis) represented in the Bundestag. It elects one member via first-past-the-post voting. Under the current constituency numbering system, it is designated as constituency 105. It is located in western North Rhine-Westphalia, comprising the northern part of the district of Mettmann.

Mettmann II was created for the 1965 federal election. Since 2009, it has been represented by Peter Beyer of the Christian Democratic Union (CDU).

Geography
Mettmann II is located in western North Rhine-Westphalia. As of the 2021 federal election, it comprises the municipalities of Heiligenhaus, Ratingen, Velbert, and Wülfrath from the district of Mettmann.

History
Mettmann II was created in 1965 and contained parts of the redistributed Düsseldorf-Mettmann constituency. Until acquiring its current name in 1980, it was known as Düsseldorf-Mettmann II. From 1965 through 1976, it was constituency 72 in the numbering system. From 1980 through 1998, it was number 73. From 2002 through 2009, it was number 106. Since 2013, it has been number 105.

Originally, the constituency comprised the municipalities of Ratingen, Velbert, Heiligenhaus, Kettwig, Langenberg, Neviges, Wittlaer, Ratingen-Lintorf, and Hubbelrath, as well as the Amt of Angerland, from the district of Düsseldorf-Mettmann. It acquired its current borders in the 1980 election.

Members
The constituency was first represented by Willi Müser of the Christian Democratic Union (CDU) from 1965 to 1969. He was succeeded by Heinz Pensky of the Social Democratic Party (SPD). Heinz Schemken of the CDU was elected in 1983 and represented the constituency until 1998, when the SPD regained it. Regina Schmidt-Zadel held it for a single term before being succeeded by Kerstin Griese in the 2002 election. In 2009, Peter Beyer of the CDU became representative. He was re-elected in 2013, 2017, and 2021.

Election results

2021 election

2017 election

2013 election

2009 election

References

Federal electoral districts in North Rhine-Westphalia
Mettmann (district)
Constituencies established in 1949
1949 establishments in West Germany